Darius Gvildys (born 26 December 1970) is a Lithuanian football coach and a former defender. He is the manager of Nevėžis.

Club career
He started career in Banga Kaunas. After that he was a member of FBK Kaunas.

Later he removed to Russia. FC Lokomotiv Nizhniy Novgorod, since 2000 was at FC Arsenal Tula.

At 2004 season he was in latvian Virsliga as the membe of Liepājas Metalurgs.

Since 2005 he played for lithuanian Sūduva Club.

After end his proffesional carerr of player, he became a trainer at 2007 season with FK Šilas Kazlų Rūda.

International career
Gvildys made 11 appearances for the Lithuania national football team between 1996 and 1999.

References

External links
 

1970 births
Sportspeople from Kaunas
Living people
Lithuanian footballers
Lithuania international footballers
Association football defenders
FBK Kaunas footballers
FC Lokomotiv Nizhny Novgorod players
FC Arsenal Tula players
FK Liepājas Metalurgs players
FK Sūduva Marijampolė players
Russian Premier League players
Russian First League players
Latvian Higher League players
A Lyga players
Lithuanian expatriate footballers
Expatriate footballers in Russia
Lithuanian expatriate sportspeople in Russia
Expatriate footballers in Latvia
Lithuanian expatriate sportspeople in Latvia
Lithuanian football managers
FBK Kaunas managers
FK Sūduva Marijampolė managers
FC Stumbras managers
FK Jonava managers
FK Nevėžis managers
A Lyga managers